Hordak is a fictional demonic character in the Masters of the Universe franchise who opposes She-Ra and He-Man, as well as the franchise's main villain, Skeletor, to whom he was once a mentor, and the cause of the latter's ambition and pursuits of evil. Hordak is the main antagonist of the She-Ra: Princess of Power animated series, in which he is the archenemy of She-Ra, He-Man's twin sister.

In this series, he rules the planet of Etheria with an army of Horde Troopers, most of whom wear a red bat symbol on their chests to convey their allegiance. According to most story media, Skeletor betrayed Hordak and trapped him in "another dimension" before beginning his own conquest of the planet Eternia. Hordak, not to be outdone, then returned with a vengeance to take over Eternia for himself.

Hordak is recognizable by his white (sometimes cream/bone colored) face, with sharp red eyes, his flat snout-like nose, red fangs, and pointed bat-like ears. He wears a collar of bones and black armor over his chest, emblazoned with the Horde bat symbol. His appearance resembles a bat-like creature, although in some media he appears more cyborg-like. Whenever he talks, he pauses his talking by snorting between his statements. According to the toy line's creator Roger Sweet, his face was modeled on an African witch doctor's mask.

Media

Movies

He-Man and She-Ra:The Secret of the Sword (1985 animated film)

In 1985, Filmation, the studio which produced the He-Man cartoon series, released a full-length 91-minute feature film titled The Secret of the Sword also known as He-Man and She-Ra: The Secret of the Sword. The movie transitioned from a focus on He-Man to an introduction of Adam's/He-Man's twin sister Adora, whom the film reveals to have been abducted, as an infant, by Hordak and Skeletor. Hordak raised Adora to be a warrior and captain for his Evil Horde and hid her true heritage from her. The film reveals that He-Man's power sword also has a twin, the Sword of Protection, which, when wielded by Adora to summon the power of Grayskull, transforms her into She-Ra, the female counterpart to He-Man. The movie grossed over three times its two-million-dollar production budget. It was later divided into several shorter segments and aired on television as the first several episodes of the He-Man & MOTU spinoff series She-Ra: Princess of Power.

Television

She-Ra: Princess of Power (1985)
Hordak and the Evil Horde originally appeared in the Filmation cartoon series She-Ra: Princess of Power. Hordak is the main antagonist of the show and is portrayed as a ruthless tyrant, who delights in the pain and misery of others, including his own minions. He rules Etheria from his headquarters, the Fright Zone. He has the ability to transform all and/or parts of his body (usually his arm/s) into a wide variety of mechanical weapons and devices, including cannons, rockets, tanks, saw blades, drills, and flamethrowers. His powers seem to be derived from a combination of magic and science. Horde Prime, who is possibly his brother, is the evil ruler of the galaxy-spanning Horde Empire. Their home planet is known as Horde World. The Horde employs a vast army of robots, tanks, aircraft, spaceships, and other advanced technology to allow them to conquer and enslave planets. An assortment of the most horrible creatures in the universe serves the Horde as the leaders of its robotic army. He also is obsessed with getting revenge on his treacherous former pupil Skeletor.

He-Man & She-Ra: A Christmas Special (1985)

At the height of the conjoined popularity of the He-Man and The Masters of The Universe and She-Ra: Princess of Power cartoons, Filmation produced this made for television Christmas movie and aired it in syndication during the 1985 Christmas Holiday season. The original He-Man and The Masters of The Universe cartoon series had aired its final new episode the prior month and continued to air in re-run episodes for some time after. Its sister show, She-Ra: Princess of Power was still in its first season. The Christmas special reunited twins He-Man and She-Ra in their biggest joint adventure since the Secret of The Sword. It commences with Queen Marlena reflecting nostalgically about Christmases on Earth, and, after a series of misadventures set in motion by Orko, climaxes with a confrontation that pits He-Man, She-Ra, and Skeletor (whose bone-hard heart has been briefly softened by a pair of Earthling children, a peculiar pup, and Christmas Spirit) against Hordak and Horde-Prime.

Masters of the Universe vs. The Snake Men (2002–2004)
In the new continuity of the 2002 Mike Young Productions animated series Masters of the Universe vs. The Snake Men, Hordak played the role of the ultimate evil in Eternia and the power behind Skeletor. Here, he is depicted as a non-technological sorcerer warlord from ancient Eternia (Preternia), who opposed Castle Grayskull's original ruler, King Grayskull, with a massive army of soldiers, sorcerers, and his original henchmen. The conflict ended when Hordak commanded his sorcerers to draw Castle Grayskull into the dark dimension of Despondos. The spell failed with King Grayskull's intervention, only destroying the area around the castle and drawing Hordak and his army into the dimension instead. However, Hordak's spirit that was ripped from his body managed to mortally wound Grayskull before being imprisoned. While trapped in Despondos, Hordak saved Keldor's life after he failed to assassinate the Eternian Elders, and had acid splashed in his face when it was deflected by Captain Randor. Hordak saved Keldor by magically removing the damaged flesh and altering his body into a more demonic form, leaving him with a skeletal appearance. Having saved his life on the promise of a later price to be paid, Hordak renamed Keldor as Skeletor. It can be noted that Hordak was far more threatening towards his minions than Skeletor was. In the episode "The Power of Grayskull", Hordak completely destroys one of his generals using telepathy simply for giving him good advice that he did not want to hear.

At a much later date, Hordak calls upon Skeletor to free him from Despondos, and Skeletor initially seems powerless to resist his mentor. However, Skeletor surprises the onlooking Evil-Lyn and He-Man by defiantly destroying Hordak's temple, thus hoping to seal his former master away forever.

Soon after Evil-Lyn attempts to free Hordak through different means with the help of Count Marzo, but after He-Man destroys the Well of Darkness, Marzo absorbs the power of his amulet and flees. It is also revealed that Hordak is responsible for creating this series' Dark Hemisphere on Eternia by performing the Spell of Separation.

Hordak was intended to be released in the new toy line, as well as being the main villain in the third season of the cartoon series. According to Ian Richter of Mattel, who initiated most of the storylines in the cartoon, Hordak was going to conquer Eternia in Season Three and serve as the main antagonist of the season before finally being overcome by Skeletor. However, the toy line and cartoon series were both canceled after the show's second season, so the third season was never produced.

She-Ra and the Princesses of Power (2018–2020)
Hordak serves as the main antagonist of the first four seasons of She-Ra and the Princesses of Power. This version of Hordak is a defective clone of Horde Prime, who served as his top general before being sent on a suicide mission when his body began to fail him. He crash-landed on Etheria after falling through a portal into the otherwise empty Despondos dimension; there he created his own branch of the Horde in an attempt to conquer Etheria in order to prove his worth to Horde Prime. He also tries to create a portal that will allow him to summon Horde Prime after the conquest is complete.

During the first season, Hordak's patience is tried by his second-in-command, the sorceress Shadow Weaver, as he considers her obsession with bringing back Horde defector Adora a distraction from their goal. He promotes Catra to the rank of Force Captain, grants her extra authority, and then, when Catra's attack on the rebel stronghold of Bright Moon nearly succeeds, appoints her as his new second-in-command. Throughout the second and third seasons, Hordak gradually begins to lose faith in Catra's competence, and he falls in love with engineer princess Entrapta, who becomes his research partner on portal technology and his first real friend. When the portal device proves unstable and nearly destroys the planet, Catra tricks Hordak into believing Entrapta betrayed him, and exiles her to cover her tracks. Although the portal is destroyed by She-Ra, it sends a signal to Horde Prime, who pin-points Hordak's location. 

In the fourth season, forced by Catra into accelerating the conquest of Etheria, Hordak begins to take a more active role in the war and enjoys a series of military victories. When Hordak learns the truth about Entrapta's exile, he attacks Catra, but she defeats him. Horde Prime's forces arrive at Etheria after the planet is freed from Despondos and Hordak is teleported to his ship. Disgusted by his clone's independent actions, Horde Prime wipes Hordak's mind and sends him away to be "reconditioned". In the fifth and final season, Hordak is reintegrated into Horde Prime's clone army, but his memories begin to return to him after finding the First Ones' crystal Entrapta gave to him and later when encountering Entrapta herself. In the series finale, he turns against Horde Prime and regains his independence to protect Entrapta, but his body is taken over by him. After She-Ra disables the Heart of Etheria and stops Horde Prime from destroying the universe with it, she erases his soul once and for all, therefore, freeing Hordak from his control, and he happily reunites with Entrapta.

Masters of the Universe: Revelation (2021)
Hordak's face can be briefly seen in the very last scene of the first season, as the red emblem appearing on Motherboard's head as she (apparently) manage to enslave Skeletor.

He Man and the Masters of the Universe (2021)
Hordak appears briefly at the end of the third season finale, "The End of the Beginning", voiced by Kevin Conroy in his final voice acting role. After initially appearing as Evil-Lyn's bat spirit, Horakoth, he saves her from the Grayskull-Havoc-empowered Skeletor's omnicidal rampage. After Skeletor's defeat, Hordak drops Evil-Lyn to safety in a desolate crater, revealing his true form to her, causing the sky to turn blood red. When asked what he wants, Hordak explains that he wants her as a herald to announce the Horde's oncoming arrival. Upon being told that she's no one's servant, Hordak assures her that she's his equal, as well as his daughter.

Toys

In the Masters of the Universe toy line
Hordak and his Evil Horde were incorporated into Mattel's Masters of the Universe toy line in 1985, to reinvigorate the line by introducing a new group of villains as adversaries to both He-Man and Skeletor. Hordak was introduced in the minicomic "Hordak: The Ruthless Leader's Revenge!", which came packaged with his action figure, in which he returns from the dimension in which he was imprisoned to wreak vengeance on Skeletor, while also making his own attempts to destroy He-Man and conquer Castle Grayskull. His character is presented as a sorcerer who has now turned his attention mainly to science, and uses a combination of magic and science, but mainly the latter, in his attempts on Eternia. He was apparently involved in events in Eternia's past such as the building of The Three Towers, which is alluded to in some of the mini-comics that came packaged with the action figures.

A second version of the character, 1986's Hurricane Hordak, with vac-metalized gold armor and an arsenal of spinning weapons, was released as a counterpart to the Flying Fists He-Man and Terror Claws Skeletor figures of the same year.

The third action figure of the character, Buzz-Saw Hordak, has become a very rare and sought-after collector's item. This toy's rare existence can be attributed to it being released in 1987, which was toward the end of the toy series original run. The mint condition (known as MOC / Mint on Card) version of this figure can fetch high dollars on auction sites such as eBay.

In other media
While Hordak came to be generally recognized as She-Ra's main adversary, most story media outside of the cartoon focuses more on Hordak as one of He-Man's arch-enemies. He features predominantly in the Star and Marvel comic series in the US as an enemy of He-Man, and also in the London Editions comics in the UK. London Editions also published a short-lived She-Ra comic series, which also stars Hordak as the main villain, explaining that he divides his time between his rulership on Etheria and his attempts at conquering Eternia. The UK comics also state that there are two Fright Zones that he operates from, one on Etheria and one on Eternia, the latter resembling Mattel's Fright Zone playset. The UK comics state that he comes from the world of Academica, apparently a world dominated by science and industry.

Hordak features prominently on DC Comics version of Masters of the Universe.

Universe

Relationship with Horde Prime
In the Filmation series and later comics derived from its continuity, Horde Prime is the only being with authority over Hordak as well as his Horde inspectors, for he is the intergalactic ruler of the Horde Empire, with control over all Horde regimes. He apparently hails from a world known as Horde World although his exact background has never been revealed. All that has ever been seen of Horde Prime is a gigantic skeletal robotic arm, which suggests he is some sort of cyborg. He travels the universe in his spaceship, the Velvet Glove, keeping watch over the Horde's universal activities.

It has been speculated (but never confirmed) that in the original continuity Horde Prime may be Hordak's brother. The main reason for this comes from the episode "The Peril of Whispering Woods", the first She-Ra episode to allude to Horde Prime. In this episode, we see Horde Prime's son, Prince Zed, who addresses Hordak as 'uncle'. This could suggest that Prime is Hordak's brother or brother-in-law, but it is also possible that Zed only called him 'uncle' as a friendly term, or he is on Zed's mother's side. However, a letter from this episode said "your nephew" stating that Hordak is his uncle but we don't know on which side.

It has not yet been confirmed whether or not Filmation's writers conceived Prime as Hordak's brother. However, he is referred to as such in the Character Profiles in Disc 6 of the She-Ra Season One DVD set.

Two UK She-Ra annuals in the mid-1980s state that Hordak is Prime's brother, but these operate within a canon independent of the cartoon and also altered Horde Prime's name, referring to him as 'Prime Horde'. The UK He-Man comics state explicitly in one issue that Horde Prime is not Hordak's brother, but again these operate within an independent canon, and Prime is depicted with a completely different appearance from the cartoon.

She-Ra and the Princesses of Power (2018–2020)
In the Netflix/DreamWorks reboot, She-Ra and the Princesses of Power, Hordak is one of the many clones of Horde Prime, who cloned himself to build a vast army to conquer everything in his path. Hordak served as Horde Prime's top general until he was revealed to be defective, and was cast out by Horde Prime, as a result, sent to die on the front lines, only for a portal to open and transport him to the planet Etheria in the empty dimension of Despondos. Horde Prime is also shown to frequently call Hordak his "little brother" despite him being abusive and considering Hordak as a wayward extension of himself.

Masters of the Universe Classics 
In 2008, Mattel debuted the Masters of the Universe Classics (MOTUC) line of action figures. This line was to be sold exclusively on its collector-centered website, mattycollector.com. This line features classic MOTU characters sculpted in an updated style with added articulation by renowned toy sculptors The Four Horsemen. Currently, the MOTUC line has no comprehensive backstory, but the figures' packaging does include short character bios that merge elements from various incarnations of the franchise, as well as some newly developed information to form a new, distinct MOTUC continuity.

Hordak's MOTUC bio states that his birth name is Hec-Tor Kur, second-born heir to the Horde Empire, who came to Eternia while battling He-Ro. Hec-Tor adopted the name "Hordak" and eventually raised an army to battle against the Snake Men for rule over Eternia. Eventually, Hordak's army defeated the Snake Men, but it was then defeated by King Grayskull, who banished Hordak to the dimension of Despondos. The official product description also refers to him as Hordak's brother.

Powers and abilities
In the Filmation series, Hordak possesses an array of powers. Unlike his treacherous former pupil Skeletor, who relies mostly on magic, the majority of Hordak's powers are seemingly the product of science. He is capable of transforming himself in a variety of ways. For example, he can turn his arm into an energy cannon, become a massive tank, and even transport himself over great distances by becoming a rocket. In the episode "The Stone in the Sword", Hordak even transforms his arm into a vacuum cleaner. Although mechanical in result, these transformations may have been magically instigated, as they occur instantaneously with an eerie glow and sound effect.

The minicomics and Marvel Star comic books depict Hordak as using magic to a greater extent, more so than science. He is shown to be a powerful dark mage of equal or greater power to Skeletor. However, in almost every canon Skeletor defeats or kills Hordak. He defeated Hordak multiple times in Filmation and was scheduled to defeat him in the MYP cartoon series. In the Classics canon, he outright kills Hordak.

As was the case with Skeletor and He-Man, Hordak received later action-figure iterations that had new special features. As Hurricane Hordak, he has the power to discharge violent whirlwinds via mechanical rotor-blades that replace his right hand. As Buzz-Saw Hordak, he can launch a deadly spinning buzz-saw-like a projectile from his chest. The accompanying minicomics explain the origins of both seemingly technological powers in clearly magical terms.

In the 2002 Mike Young Productions cartoon, Hordak briefly appears in flashbacks and in astral form via "dimensional portals". He is depicted as a supremely powerful magic-user, seemingly of vastly greater power than Skeletor, and with no apparent reliance on technology whatsoever, other than his Horde Troopers, although it is unknown if these redesigned minions are still intended to be robots like the original versions.

In the 2018 Netflix/DreamWorks reboot, Hordak is extremely intelligent with "a brilliant, technological mind". Part of Hordak's intelligence includes a firmly pragmatic streak in his personality that endeavors to direct his minions to practical goals while maintaining relatively good relations with them such as encouraging them to pursue projects he finds worthwhile.  He also wears an exo-armor that serves as his life support, later upgraded with First One's technology to give him superhuman strength. In the fourth season, Hordak starts wielding a powerful energy cannon on his right arm similar to the original series when he starts actively fighting battles.

Reception
In February 2017, Comic Book Resources ranked the character third among "Eternia’s 15 Mightiest Villains".

References

External links
Hordak at Comic Vine

Extraterrestrial supervillains
Fictional characters introduced in 1984
Fictional characters who use magic
Fictional characters with energy-manipulation abilities
Fictional characters with immortality
Fictional clones
Fictional commanders
Fictional cyborgs
Fictional demons and devils
Fictional humanoids
Fictional mad scientists
Fictional royalty
Fictional shapeshifters
Fictional warlords
Fictional wizards
Male characters in animated series
Masters of the Universe Evil Horde
Princess of Power characters
Villains in animated television series